Luis Alberni (October 4, 1886 – December 23, 1962) was a Spanish-born American character actor of stage and films.

Early years
Alberni was born in Barcelona, Spain, on October 4, 1886. He acted in stock theater for four years in Marseille before he went back to Barcelona, earned a BA degree, and studied law.

Career 
Alberni was acting in Bordeaux when American humorist Wilson Mizner and playwright Paul Armstrong invited him to come to the United States, offering their help. In April 1912, he sailed to New York City as a steerage passenger aboard the S/S Nieuw Amsterdam. 

In New York, Alberni acted on both stage and screen. His first motion picture performance was in the 1915 Jewish drama, Children of the Ghetto. On the stage, he appeared in more than a dozen Broadway plays between 1915 and 1928, including 39 East, Dreams for Sale and the original production of What Price Glory? in 1924–1925. In the sound film era, he had notable roles as Jacopo in The Count of Monte Cristo (1934), as Mr. Louis Louis in Easy Living (1937), and as the mayor in A Bell for Adano (1945).

Personal life and death 
Alberni and his wife, Charlotte, married on April 18, 1919, in New York City. They were divorced on February 3, 1938. They had three children.

Alberni died at the motion picture actors' home in Woodland Hills, California in 1962. His remains are interred in an unmarked grave at Valhalla Memorial Park Cemetery in North Hollywood.

Complete filmography

 Children of the Ghetto (1915) - Pincus - the Poet
 The Madonna of the Slums (1919, Short)
 39 East (1920) - Count Gionelli
 Little Italy (1921) - Ricci
 The Man from Beyond (1922) - Captain of the Barkentine
 The Bright Shawl (1923) - Vincente Escobar - Andre's Brother
 The Valley of Lost Souls (1923) - Jacques
 Second Youth (1924) - Greenwich Village Party Guest (uncredited)
 The Cheerful Fraud (1926) - Valet (uncredited)
 The Battle of Paris (1929) - Waiter (uncredited)
 The Santa Fe Trail (1930) - Juan Castinado
 Strange Birds (1930, Short) - The Baron
 One Heavenly Night (1931) - Violinist (uncredited)
 Svengali (1931) - Gecko
 Monkey Business in Africa (1931, Short) - Julius Gonzola
 Sweepstakes (1931) - Cantina Bartender (uncredited)
 Movie-Town (1931, Short) - Baron Gonzola
 Children of Dreams (1931) - (uncredited)
 The Last Flight (1931) - Spectator at Bullfight (uncredited)
 I Like Your Nerve (1931) - Sao Pedro Waiter (uncredited)
 I Surrender Dear (1931, Short) - Marquis
 The Tip-Off (1931) - Scarno - Roadhouse Manager (uncredited)
 The Great Junction Hotel (1931, Short)
 The Mad Genius (1931) - Sergei Bankieff
 Men in Her Life (1931) - Anton
 Manhattan Parade (1931) - Vassily Vassiloff
 Cock of the Air (1932) - Capt. Tonnino
 High Pressure (1932) - Colombo (uncredited)
 The Girl in the Tonneau (1932, Short) - Luis Mazetti
 Stop That Run (1932, Short)
 Hombres de mi vida (1932) - Gaston
 The Cohens and Kellys in Hollywood (1932) - Bladimir Petrosky
 Rule 'Em and Weep (1932, Short) - Anarchist
 The Woman in Room 13 (1932) - Peppi Tonelli
 First in War (1932, Short) - President of the Revolutionary Party of Nicarania
 Week-End Marriage (1932) - Louis - the Bootlegger (uncredited)
 Crooner (1932) - Tamborini (uncredited)
 Two Against the World (1932) - Yelling Courtroom Spectator (uncredited)
 A Parisian Romance (1932) - Pascal
 The Big Stampede (1932) - Sonora Joe
 Trouble in Paradise (1932) - Annoyed Opera Fan (uncredited)
 Guilty or Not Guilty (1932) - Pete
 The Conquerors (1932) - Second Agitator (uncredited)
 The Bride's Bereavement; or, The Snake in the Grass (1932, Short)
 Rasputin and the Empress (1932) - Photographer's Assistant (uncredited)
 Hypnotized (1932) - Hungarian Consul
 Artist's Muddles (1933, Short) - Pietro Cellini 
 Child of Manhattan (1933) - Bustamente
 Topaze (1933) - Dr. Bomb
 Men Must Fight (1933) - Soto
 The California Trail (1933) - Commandant Emilio Quierra
 Infernal Machine (1933) - Excitable Italian Passenger (uncredited)
 Trick for Trick (1933) - Metzger
 The Sphinx (1933) - Luigi Baccigalupi
 When Ladies Meet (1933) - Pierre - the Servant
 I Love That Man (1933) - Angelo - Janitor
 The Man from Monterey (1933) - Felipe Guadalupe Constacio Delgado Santa Cruz de la Verranca
 The Last Trail (1933) - Pedro Gonzales
 Sherman Said It (1933, Short) - Frenchman
 Stage Mother (1933) - Hors D'Oeuvres Waiter (uncredited)
 Menu (1933, Short) - The Master Chef (uncredited)
 The Chief (1933) - Man at Alderman Meeting (uncredited)
 Goodbye Love (1933) - Tony
 Havana Widows (1933) - Second Taxi Driver (uncredited)
 Lady Killer (1933) - Director (uncredited)
 Above the Clouds (1933) - Speakeasy Owner
 California Weather (1933, Short)
 By Candlelight (1933) - Train Porter (uncredited)
 Flying Down to Rio (1933) - Rio Casino Manager (uncredited)
 Cold Turkey (1933, hort)
 La ciudad de cartón (1934) - Craig
 When Do We Eat? (1934, Short) - Rigo - Restaurant Owner
 Glamour (1934) - Monsieur Paul
 I Believed in You (1934) - Giacomo
 The Black Cat (1934) - Train Steward (uncredited)
 Strictly Dynamite (1934) - Jake (uncredited)
 Stingaree (1934) - Italian Celebrant (uncredited)
 La buenaventura (1934) - Fresco
 The Count of Monte Cristo (1934) - Jacopo
 One Night of Love (1934) - Giovanni
 When Strangers Meet (1934) - Nick Panaro
 The Captain Hates the Sea (1934) - Juan Gilboa
 Caravane (1934) - Gypsy Chieftain
 The Gilded Lily (1935) - Nate Porcopolis
 The Good Fairy (1935) - The Barber
 The Winning Ticket (1935) - Tony Capucci
 Rendezvous at Midnight (1935) - Janitor
 Roberta (1935) - Alexander Petrovitch Moscovitch Voyda
 Asegure a su mujer (1935) - Bernardo Perry
 Public Opinion (1935) - Caparini
 Let's Live Tonight (1935) - Mario Weems
 Goin' to Town (1935) - Sr. Vitola
 In Caliente (1935) - The Magistrate
 Ticket or Leave It (1935, Short)
 Love Me Forever (1935) - Luigi
 Manhattan Moon (1935) - Luigi
 The Gay Deception (1935) - Ernest
 Metropolitan (1935) - Ugo Pizzi
 Bad Boy (1935) - Tony
 Music Is Music (1935) - Señor Castellano - Cafe Proprietor
 Colleen (1936) - Carlo
 Dancing Pirate (1936) - Pamfilo (the Jailer)
 Ticket to Paradise (1936) - Dr. Munson aka Monte
 Anthony Adverse (1936) - Tony Guisseppi
 Follow Your Heart (1936) - Tony Masetti
 Hats Off (1936) - Rosero
 When You're in Love (1937) - Luis Perugini
 Two Wise Maids (1937) - Guili
 The King and the Chorus Girl (1937) - Gaston
 Sing and Be Happy (1937) - Posini
 Easy Living (1937) - Mr. Louis Louis
 Mr. Dodd Takes the Air (1937) - Bit Part (uncredited)
 Madame X (1937) - Scipio
 The Great Garrick (1937) - Basset
 Under Suspicion (1937) - Luigi
 Manhattan Merry-Go-Round (1937) - Martinetti
 Love on Toast (1937) - Joe Piso
 Hitting a New High (1937) - Luis Marlo
 I'll Give a Million (1938) - Reporter
 The Great Man Votes (1939) - Manos
 Let Freedom Ring (1939) - Tony (uncredited)
 Naughty but Nice (1939) - Stanislaus Pysinski
 The Housekeeper's Daughter (1939) - Veroni
 The Amazing Mr. Williams (1939) - Rinaldo (uncredited)
 High School (1940) - Signor Cicero (uncredited)
 Twincuplets (1940, Short) - Annoyed Opera Fan
 Enemy Agent (1940) - A. Calteroni
 The Lone Wolf Meets a Lady (1940) - Nicolo Pappakontous (uncredited)
 Scatterbrain (1940) - Prof. DeLemma
 Public Deb No. 1 (1940) - Frontenac (uncredited)
 So You Won't Talk (1940) - Barber (uncredited)
 The Lady Eve (1941) - Pike's Chef
 That Hamilton Woman (1941) - King of Naples
 Road to Zanzibar (1941) - Proprietor - Native Booth
 They Met in Argentina (1941) - Don Luis Jose Alfonso Frutos y Murphy (uncredited)
 She Knew All the Answers (1941) - Inventor
 San Antonio Rose (1941) - Nick Ferris
 They Met in Bombay (1941) - Maitre d'hotel
 World Premiere (1941) - Signor Scaletti
 Babes on Broadway (1941) - Nick
 Obliging Young Lady (1942) - Riccardi
 I Married an Angel (1942) - Jean Frederique (uncredited)
 Mexican Spitfire's Elephant (1942) - Luigi
 Northwest Rangers (1942) - Jacques (uncredited)
 Two Weeks to Live (1943) - Van Dyke / Dr. Jekyll (uncredited)
 My Son, the Hero (1943) - Tony
 Submarine Base (1943) - Mr. Styx
 The Man from Down Under (1943) - Dino Piza (uncredited)
 Here Comes Kelly (1943) - Nick
 You're a Lucky Fellow, Mr. Smith (1943) - Goreni
 Nearly Eighteen (1943) - Gus
 Here Comes Elmer (1943) - Dr. Zichy
 Harvest Melody (1943) - Cafe Manager
 Men on Her Mind (1944) - Alberti Verdi
 Voice in the Wind (1944) - Bartender
 It Happened Tomorrow (1944) - Restaurant Owner (uncredited)
 Henry Aldrich Plays Cupid (1944) - Tony (uncredited)
 In Society (1944) - Luigi - Pottery Dealer (uncredited)
 Machine Gun Mama (1944) - Ignacio
 Rainbow Island (1944) - Jerry - Native with Laundry (uncredited)
 The Conspirators (1944) - Prison Guard (uncredited)
 When the Lights Go On Again (1944) - Joe
 The Captain from Köpenick (1945) - Prison Guard
 Wonder Man (1945) - Opera Prompter (uncredited)
 A Bell for Adano (1945) - Cacopardo
 Hit the Hay (1945) - French Professor (uncredited)
 In Fast Company (1946) - Tony - Fruit Vendor
 Double Rhythm (1946, Short) - Mr. Palucci
 Night Song (1946) - Flower Vendor (scenes deleted)
 When Willie Comes Marching Home (1950) - Barman (uncredited)
 Captain Carey, U.S.A. (1950) - Sandro
 What Price Glory? (1952) - Grand Uncle (uncredited)
 The Ten Commandments (1956) - Old Hebrew at Moses' House (uncredited) (final film role)

References

External links

 
 
 
 

1886 births
1962 deaths
American male film actors
American male silent film actors
Male actors from Barcelona
Spanish emigrants to the United States
Male film actors from Catalonia
Burials at Valhalla Memorial Park Cemetery
20th-century American male actors
American people of Catalan descent